Ali Reza Kheradmand (born 24 May 1985) know professionally as Ali Reza, is an Indian model and actor who works in Telugu cinema. He made his debut as lead role in Gayakudu (2015), followed by Cine Mahal (2017) and Naa Rautee Separate (2017). In 2019 he participated in the reality television show Bigg Boss 3.

Early life
Reza completed his education from St John's Church High School and St John's College and is the only son to their parents and worked in Dubai for couple of years before coming into entertainment industry. Reza also owns the restaurant Ramser at Marredpally, Hyderabad which was started by their ancestors from Iran.

Career
Reza made his film debut in the 2008 Hindi film Mukhbiir and entered the Telugu industry in 2010 through the TV serial Passupu KumKuma. associated with Zee Telugu and then went on to do a character role in Chandamama Lo Amrutham in 2014 and finally got a break as lead in Gayakudu in the same year and the movie went on to do good at box office.

Personal life
Reza married Masuma Beiki, an air hostess in 2018.

Filmography

 All films are in Telugu, unless otherwise noted.

Television

References

External links 

Living people
Indian male film actors
1985 births
Bigg Boss (Telugu TV series) contestants
Male actors in Telugu television
21st-century Indian male actors
Male actors from Hyderabad, India
Male actors in Telugu cinema
Indian soap opera actors